Springwater may refer to one of these places:

 Springwater, New York, United States
 Springwater, Ontario, Canada
Springwater (Barrie Airpark) Aerodrome, located near Springwater, Ontario, Canada
 Springwater, Oregon, United States
Springwater Corridor, a bicycle and pedestrian trail named for Springwater, Oregon, United States
 Springwater, Wisconsin, United States
Other
 Springwater, a pseudonym for the musician Phil Cordell